James Norman Lyons Byron (4 November 1897 – 28 February 1959) was an Australian rules footballer who played with Fitzroy in the Victorian Football League (VFL).

Notes

External links 
		

1897 births
1959 deaths
Australian rules footballers from Victoria (Australia)
Fitzroy Football Club players
Indigenous Australian players of Australian rules football